Premier Asia was a UK DVD distribution company, operating between the years 2003 - 2008. It was owned by Contender Entertainment Group until the summer of 2007 when Contender was purchased by Entertainment One. Premier Asia is the sister company of Hong Kong Legends, and whilst that company specialised only in Hong Kong films, Premier Asia encompassed films from all of the major film making centres of Asia (outside of mainland China), specifically Japan, South Korea and Thailand.

In keeping with the Hong Kong Legends DVD format, many of the earlier releases included audio commentaries from Hong Kong cinema expert, producer and screenwriter Bey Logan, he is here partnered for many releases with Asian cinema expert Mike Leeder.

Releases 

 Bang Rajan
 Bichunmoo
 Brotherhood
 Champion
 The City of Violence
 Crying Fist
 Duelist
 Ju-on: The Grudge
 Ju-on: The Grudge 2
 Ichi the Killer
 Ichi the Killer : Episode Zero (anime)
 Initial D
 My Wife Is a Gangster
 Once Upon a Time in High School
 One Missed Call
 Ong-Bak
 Shutter
 The Warrior
 Typhoon
 Volcano High
 Warrior King

References 

Film distributors of the United Kingdom